Antrax is the second book in Terry Brooks' The Voyage of the Jerle Shannara fantasy trilogy. It was first published in 2001.

Plot

The voyage to find the lost magic takes the companions to the continent of Parkasia. Here, they are split up, and Walker, despite all his plans and his enormous power, finds himself caught and trapped by an unseen force, a supercomputer built by the ancient humans. Antrax was created to store data and information from its time and it is given a duty, an order to protect the information that it holds. However, when the Great War broke out, the last of its creators returned, and gave Antrax its final task: protect the information at all costs, no matter what the price. Antrax then began to build its own arsenal of defence mechanisms: lasers and Creepers.

Above Castledown, the crew of the Jerle Shannara find themselves besieged by evil forces, and the Ilse Witch confronts the Druid's protégé, Bek Ohmsford, who claims that she is actually Grianne Ohmsford, and that he is the brother she last saw as an infant - now a young man who carries the Sword of Shannara and wields the magic of the wishsong. Truls Rohk keeps protecting Bek buying him time till the Ilse Witch finally takes up the Sword of Shannara to realize the truth of her life.

In parallel plot Ahren Elessedil works his way in retrieving the lost elf stones, also Quentin Leah with the help of locals finally are able to kill the minion created by Antrax.

Meanwhile, Walker realises that the 'magic' they have been searching for is actually the science of the Old World, stored on Antrax, which could be used to rebuild society with new technology. But there is no practical way to access this information, so Walker chooses to destroy the power-hungry computer, which is quickly becoming a danger to the whole world. However, he is mortally wounded in the process. In the end a fleet of airships reach Parkasia under leadership of Morgawr willing to kill all left of the company and take the magic for himself.

It is believed that Antrax was in fact initially known as Oronyx Experimental and appears in The Elves of Cintra.

Main characters
The main characters are:
Walker Boh
Ahren Elessedil
Redden Alt Mer
Rue Meridian
Bek Rowe

External links
Del Rey Online | The Voyage of the Jerle Shannara: Antrax by Terry Brooks - official webpage for mass market paperback edition.

Shannara novels
2001 American novels
High fantasy novels
Del Rey books